San José Chiltepec is a town and municipality in Oaxaca in south-western Mexico. The municipality covers an area of 204.13 km². 
It is part of the Tuxtepec District of the Papaloapan Region.

As of 2005, the municipality had a total population of 10203.

References

Municipalities of Oaxaca